Sir Edward Derrick Wingfield Verner, 6th Baronet (28 May 1907 – 27 March 1975) was an Anglo-Irish soldier, usually known as Derrick Verner.

The son of Sir Edward Wingfield Verner, 5th Baronet, by his marriage to Agnes Dorothy Laming, Verner was educated at Gresham's School, Holt, in Norfolk, and Magdalen College, Oxford, where he graduated Bachelor of Arts in 1928. Unfortunately for Verner, the family estates in Ireland had been separated from the title in 1886, when the third baronet left them to an adopted son. However, his father had inherited Corke Abbey, and the family lived there until 1922, when Verner's father sold up and settled in England.

Verner gained the rank of Lieutenant in the service of the Rifle Brigade. He married Angèle Becco, daughter of Louis Becco, on 7 February 1948. He died in 1975, without issue. Verner's younger brother, John Wingfield Verner, had married Sybil Leigh-Pemberton in 1934, but he also had no children and died in 1943, so with Verner's death, the title became extinct.

Arms

References

1907 births
1975 deaths
Alumni of Magdalen College, Oxford
Baronets in the Baronetage of the United Kingdom
People educated at Gresham's School